Cheng Yuan (born 8 October 1993) is a Chinese footballer who plays as a forward for Chinese club a Jinan Xingzhou.

Club career
Cheng Yuan began his football career in 2011 when he was promoted to Shandong Youth's squad for the 2011 China League Two campaign. He spent two season in Shandong Youth, scoring nines goals in thirty-two appearances. In September 2013, he was loaned to Segunda Liga side S.C. Covilhã until the end of 2013/14 season. On 23 October 2013, he made his debut for Covilhã in a league match against Sporting CP B where he coming on as a substitute for Tiago Lopes in the 86th minute.

Cheng returned to Shandong and was promoted to first team squad by Cuca in the summer of 2014. On 13 May 2015, he made his debut for Shandong in a 2015 Chinese FA Cup against amateur team Wuhan New Era, coming on as a substitute for Zheng Zheng in the 65th minute. He made his Chinese Super League debut on 20 June 2015 in a 2–1 home defeat against Guangzhou Evergrande, coming on for Zheng Zheng in the 82nd minute. Although failing to establish himself within the senior team, Cheng was the highest goalscorer with a new record of 23 goals in the 2015 Chinese Super League reserve league. He was demoted to the reserve squad in July 2016 after Felix Magath became the manager of the club. He defended the title of highest goalscorer in the 2016 Chinese Super League reserve league with 20 goals. On 2 May 2017, he scored his first and second goal for the club in the 2017 Chinese FA Cup as Shandong Luneng beat China League Two club Jilin Baijia 4–1. He won the top goalscorer of Chinese Super League reserve league for the third time in 2017, scoring 24 goals in the season.

Career statistics
.

Honours

Club
Shandong Luneng
Chinese Super League: 2021
Chinese FA Cup: 2021
Chinese FA Super Cup: 2015

References

External links

1993 births
Living people
Chinese footballers
Footballers from Shandong
Sportspeople from Jinan
Association football forwards
Liga Portugal 2 players
S.C. Covilhã players
Chinese expatriate footballers
Expatriate footballers in Portugal
Chinese expatriate sportspeople in Portugal
Shandong Taishan F.C. players
Zibo Cuju F.C. players
Taizhou Yuanda F.C. players
Chinese Super League players
China League One players
China League Two players